Hemiconus stromboides is an extinct species of sea snail, a marine gastropod mollusk, in the family Conidae, the cone snails and their allies.

Distribution
Fossils of this marine species were found in France.

References

 Palmer, Katherine Van Winkle, and Jean Baptiste Pierre Antoine de Monet. The unpublished vélins of Lamarck, 1802-1809: illustrations of fossils of the Paris Basin Eocene. Paleontological Research Institution, 1977.
 Tracey S., Craig B., Belliard L. & Gain O. (2017). One, four or forty species? - early Conidae (Mollusca, Gastropoda) that led to a radiation and biodiversity peak in the late Lutetian Eocene of the Cotentin, NW France. Carnets de Voyages Paléontologiques dans le Bassin Anglo-Parisien. 3: 1-38

stromboides
Gastropods described in 1802